Trossingen (Swabian: Drossinge) is a town in Baden-Württemberg, Germany. It is situated in a region called Baar, between the Swabian Alb and the Black Forest. Stuttgart is about an hour away, Lake Constance about half an hour, and the source of the river Danube can be reached in about twenty minutes by car.
Trossingen is renowned as a "music town". Although it has only nearly 17,000 inhabitants as of December 31, 2018, the town is home to the renowned 'University of Music Trossingen'  (with its famous Early Music department), which is one of Baden-Württemberg's five state conservatories, and there are several other institutions specializing in musical education, like the 'Bundesakademie für musikalische Jugendbildung'  and the 'Hohner Konservatorium' .

In 1830  from Trossingen, a cloth maker and weaver, copied a harmonica brought to Trossingen by his next door neighbor, a clockmaker from Vienna. This was the beginning of musical instrument production in the town. Messner was so successful at making such instruments that eventually his brother and some relatives also started making harmonicas. From 1840 on his nephew Christian Weiss started working on his own, so by 1855 there were two registered businesses - Christian Messner & Co. and Württ. Harmonikafabrik Ch. WEISS. Trossingen is also the home of the world's oldest extant harmonica manufacturer, C.A Seydel Sohne, founded in 1847.

In 1857 the Matthias Hohner company was founded. Today, Hohner harmonicas and accordions are well known all over the world. Trossingen also houses the German Harmonica Museum.

Trossingen has a historic railway: the Trossinger Eisenbahn.

At the edge of town, in a former clay quarry, were found several dozen skeletons, both complete and partial, of the prosauropod dinosaur Plateosaurus engelhardti during excavations in the early 20th century. The local museum Auberlehaus houses several original bones.

International relations

Trossingen is twinned with:

 Cluses, France
 Beaverton, Oregon,  United States
 Windhoek, Namibia

References

External links
 
German Harmonica Museum
Staatliche Hochschule für Musik Trossingen/University of Music Trossingen
A visit to Trossingen, with special emphasis on the old Hohner factory and its influence (pictures) 
Living in Trossingen (emphasis on the city's musical endeavor)
 Hohner's 150th Anniversary Celebration - September 8, 2007

Tuttlingen (district)
Württemberg